Colorblind is the only single released by ex-Dream Theater Keyboardist Kevin Moore, under his standard recording name, Chroma Key. The standard edit of Colorblind can be found as track 1 of the album Dead Air for Radios. The CD contains 6 tracks, including the feature radio edit single of Colorblind, along with radio edits of two other tracks from the same album (On the Page and Even the Waves.) The CD also contains demo versions of the two aforementioned tracks, as well as a demo of a song called "Blanket", which did not appear on the album. The CD very rare and nearly impossible to buy, but a download version is available via the official website. This download edition features 3 bonus tracks, which are the 3 tracks from the original 1995 Chroma Key Demo. This Demo features demo versions of "On the Page", "Watercolor" and "Chroma Key".  The demo version of "On the Page" found on the CD proper differs from the original 1995 demo version, found on the download version of the single.

Track listing
"Colorblind (radio edit)"
"On The Page (radio edit)"
"Even The Waves (radio edit)"
"Blanket (early demo)"
"On The Page (early demo)"
"Even The Waves (early demo)"

Original 1995 Chroma Key Demo - Bonus Material in Download Edition (These are the last three tracks of the demo CD "This is a Recording" which was distributed by Moore under his real name rather than under the "Chroma Key" project name)
"On The Page (1995)"
"Watercolor (1995)"
"Chroma Key"

1999 singles
1999 songs